Draganovo may refer to:

 In Bulgaria (written in Cyrillic as Драганово):
 Draganovo, Burgas Province - a village in the Burgas municipality, Burgas Province
 Draganovo, Dobrich Province - a village in the Dobrich municipality, Dobrich Province
 Draganovo, Kardzhali Province - a village in the Chernoochene municipality, Kardzhali Province
 Draganovo, Veliko Tarnovo Province - a village in the Gorna Oryahovitsa municipality, Veliko Tarnovo Province